The Paper Man is a 1990 Australian mini series about a fictitious media mogul.

References

External links

1990 television films
1990 films
1990s Australian television miniseries
1990 Australian television series debuts
1990 Australian television series endings
Films directed by Peter Fisk
Films scored by Chris Neal (songwriter)